A collapsar is a star which has undergone gravitational collapse. When a star no longer has enough fuel for significant fusion reactions, there are three possible outcomes, depending on the star's mass: If it is less than the Chandrasekhar limit (1.4 solar masses), the star will stabilize and shrink, becoming a white dwarf; between the Chandrasekhar limit and the Tolman–Oppenheimer–Volkoff limit (approximately 3 solar masses), it will become a neutron star; and above the Tolman–Oppenheimer–Volkoff limit, the star will become a black hole. However, it is theorized that the high density of neutron star cores allow for quark matter and, as a result, a star that is more massive than even the Tolman–Oppenheimer–Volkoff limit, yet still isn't a black hole.

See also
 List of collapsars

References 

Neutron stars
White dwarfs
Black holes